Plateau Creek  may refer to

 Plateau Creek (Colorado), a tributary of the Colorado River in the United States
 Plateau Creek (Wyoming), a stream in the Columbia River Watershed in the United States